Young Bess is a 1944 historical novel by the British writer Margaret Irwin. It was the first of trilogy focusing on the life of Elizabeth I of England. It focuses on her years as a princess during the reign of her father Henry VIII. It was followed by two sequels, Elizabeth, Captive Princess (1948) and Elizabeth and the Prince of Spain (1953).

Adaptation
In 1953 it was adapted into a Hollywood film of the same title directed by George Sidney and starring Jean Simmons, Stewart Granger, Deborah Kerr and Charles Laughton.

References

Bibliography
 Ford, Elizabeth. Royal Portraits in Hollywood: Filming the Lives of Queens. University Press of Kentucky, 2009.
 Kirkpatrick, D. L. Twentieth-century Romance and Gothic Writers. Gale Research, 1982.

1944 British novels
Novels by Margaret Irwin
British historical novels
Novels set in London
Novels set in the 16th century
British novels adapted into films
Chatto & Windus books